Petroleum is a naturally occurring, flammable hydrocarbon.

Petroleum may also refer to:

Petroleum coke
Petroleum engineering
Petroleum ether
Petroleum extraction
Petroleum industry
Petroleum licensing
Petroleum geochemistry
Petroleum geology
Ministry of Petroleum
The Petroleum Institute
Petroleum jelly
Petroleum politics
A Petroleum product
A petroleum reservoir
Liquefied petroleum gas
Strategic Petroleum Reserve (disambiguation)

Place names
Petroleum, Indiana
 Petroleum, Kentucky
Petroleum County, Montana
Petroleum, West Virginia

Arts
"Petroleum", a song by Swedish band Kent from their 2012 album Jag är inte rädd för mörkret
Petroleum (film), 1936 Mexican film

See also
Petrol (disambiguation)
Gasoline (disambiguation)